The General Electric LM500  is an industrial and marine gas turbine produced by GE Aviation. The LM500 is a derivative of the General Electric TF34 aircraft engine. Current versions of the LM500 deliver 6,000 shaft horsepower (4.47 MW) with a thermal efficiency of 31 percent at ISO conditions. It has been used in various applications such as in the Royal Danish Navy's Flyvefisken class patrol vessels, and in fast ferries.

Applications

Naval
Denmark
 Flyvefisken-class patrol vessel
Japan
 Hayabusa-class patrol boat
 Izumo-class helicopter destroyer
 1-go-class patrol boat
South Korea
 Gumdoksuri-class patrol vessel

Commercial
TurboJET
 FoilCat

Industrial
Pipeline transport
 Tennessee Gas Pipeline Kinder Morgan
 ExxonMobil Australia
 State Energy Commission of Western Australia. AlintaGas
 Nova - now TC Energy

Research
Railgun
 University of Texas - Center for Electromechanics - CEM

See also

References

External links
 GE LM500 website

Aero-derivative engines
Marine engines
Gas turbines